James Simpson (8 December 1923 – 1 May 2010) was an English professional footballer who played as an inside forward in the Football League for Chesterfield and in non-League football for Buxton, and as a wartime guest for Stoke City.

Career
Born in Clay Cross, Derbyshire, Simpson started his career with Parkhouse Colliery where he also worked as a miner. In 1946 he signed professional terms for Football League Second Division side Chesterfield where he went on to make three league appearances during the 1946–47 season, including a 2–0 win over Manchester United. In January 1948, he signed for Cheshire County League side Buxton, also returning to face work at Parkhouse Colliery. In 1948, he suffered a fall in the mine and was crushed causing a severe back injury which curtailed his football career.

Personal life
After retiring from full-time football, he worked for North East Derbyshire District Council as a driver until retirement. He died on 1 May 2010 in Matlock, Derbyshire at the age of 86.

References

1923 births
2010 deaths
People from Clay Cross
Footballers from Derbyshire
English footballers
Chesterfield F.C. players
Buxton F.C. players
English Football League players
Stoke City F.C. wartime guest players
Association football inside forwards
Parkhouse Colliery F.C. players